Sara Hess is a television writer and producer. She has worked in both capacities on the drama series House and Orange Is the New Black.

Career
Hess joined the crew of the HBO western drama Deadwood as a writer for the second season in 2005. She wrote the episode "Advances, None Miraculous".

From 2005 to 2012, Hess worked on the medical drama series House, for which she wrote 17 episodes.

Since 2013, she has been working on Orange Is the New Black. More recently, she worked for House of the Dragon, and signed a HBO overall deal.

Filmography

 Deadwood (Writer)
 Advances, None Miraculous (S2E10)
 House (Supervising Producer, Co-Producer, Producer) Writer for following episodes:
 Spin (S2E6)
 Sleeping Dogs Lie (S2E18)
 Finding Judas (S3E9)
 Act Your Age (S3E19)
 You Don't Want To Know (S4E8)
 Living the Dream (S4E14)
 Lucky Thirteen (S5E5)
 The Greater Good (S5E14)
 Epic Fail (S4E3)
 The Down Low (S4E11)
 Open and Shut (S6E19)
 Larger Than Life (S7E9)
 Bombshells (S7E15)
 The Dig (S7E18)
 Charity Case (S8E3)
 Man of the House (S8E13)
 We Need the Eggs (S8E17)
 Orange Is the New Black (Co-Executive Producer, Executive Producer) Writer for following episodes:
 Blood Donut (S1E7)
 Fool Me Once (S1E12)
 Comic Sans (S2E7)
 It Was The Change (S2E12)
 Ching Chong Chang (S3E6)
 Don't Make Me Come Back There (S3E12)
 Power Suit (S4E2)
 Turn Table Turn (S4E9)
 House of the Dragon (Executive Producer) Writer for following episodes:
 The Princess and the Queen (S1E6)
 The Green Council (S1E9)

References

External links

American television producers
American women television producers
American television writers
American women television writers
Living people
Year of birth missing (living people)
Place of birth missing (living people)
American LGBT screenwriters
American lesbian writers
LGBT producers
21st-century American women writers